Louis Svećenski (born Ljudevit Kohn; November 7, 1862 – June 18, 1926) was notable Croatian-American violist, violinist and rector of the Boston Academy of Music.

Svećenski was born in Osijek, Donji grad district on November 7, 1862 to a Jewish family. His father Adolf Abraham Kohn was from Bonyhád in Hungary, and his mother Terezija (née Fried) was from Darda just north of Osijek. Svećenski finished elementary and high school in Osijek. In 1877, with only 15 years of age, Svećenski was recognized by Osijek cultural public as the potential future musician. He graduated from the Croatian Music Institute in Zagreb on August 26, 1882 with compliments from Ivan Zajc. In September 1882, Svećenski enrolled at University of Music and Performing Arts, Vienna with the scholarship from the Croatian government in the amount of 500 krones. He studied violin. On July 15, 1885 he graduated from the Vienna University as a violinist with excellent grade. After graduation Svećenski returned to Zagreb where he asked Croatian authorities to let him croaticize his surname from Kohn to Svećenski. His surname Kohn is variation of surname Kohen which means priest in Hebrew, while Svećenski is derived from Croatian word svećenik which also means priest. How much he cared about his new surname is witnessed through the records from the time of his great popularity in the United States, where he requested that his last name is written with the right Croatian spelling, a letter "ć".

On July 10, 1885 Svećenski moved to Boston, Massachusetts. He was a founding member of the famous Kneisel Quartet and besides Franz Kneisel was the only original member to play with the quartet during its entire history from 1885–1917. He also played in the Boston Symphony Orchestra for 18 years (1885–1903), serving variously as a violist and violinist. He taught for several years at the Juilliard School and was one of the original faculty members at the Curtis Institute of Music (1924–1926). Some of his notable pupils include conductor and violinist Robert Talbot, and violist and composer Carlton Cooley.

Svećenski is credited with the erection of Osijek memorial plaque in 1895, for his friend Franjo Krežma. He stayed in touch with his hometown and family until the day he died on June 18, 1926.

Pedagogical works
 25 Technical Exercises for Viola (1917)
 Preparatory Exercises on the Violin for the Trill, the Vibrato and the Staccato, Preceded by Corrective Studies for the First and Fourth Fingers (1922)
 Specialized Exercises for Violin in Shifting and in Crossing the Strings (1923)

References

Bibliography

 

1862 births
1926 deaths
People from the Kingdom of Croatia-Slavonia
People from Osijek
Austro-Hungarian Jews
Croatian Jews
University of Music and Performing Arts Vienna alumni
Jewish violinists
American classical violists
American classical violinists
Male classical violinists
American male violinists
Curtis Institute of Music faculty
Juilliard School faculty
Austro-Hungarian emigrants to the United States